In fluid mechanics and hydraulics, open-channel flow is a type of liquid flow within a conduit with a free surface, known as a channel. The other type of flow within a conduit is pipe flow. These two types of flow are similar in many ways but differ in one important respect: open-channel flow has a free surface, whereas pipe flow does not.

Classifications of flow

Open-channel flow can be classified and described in various ways based on the change in flow depth with respect to time and space. The fundamental types of flow dealt with in open-channel hydraulics are:

 Time as the criterion
 Steady flow
 The depth of flow does not change over time, or if it can be assumed to be constant during the time interval under consideration.
 Unsteady flow
 The depth of flow does change with time.
 Space as the criterion
 Uniform flow
 The depth of flow is the same at every section of the channel. Uniform flow can be steady or unsteady, depending on whether or not the depth changes with time, (although unsteady uniform flow is rare).
 Varied flow
 The depth of flow changes along the length of the channel. Varied flow technically may be either steady or unsteady. Varied flow can be further classified as either rapidly or gradually-varied:
 Rapidly-varied flow
 The depth changes abruptly over a comparatively short distance.  Rapidly varied flow is known as a local phenomenon. Examples are the hydraulic jump and the hydraulic drop.
 Gradually-varied flow
 The depth changes over a long distance.
 Continuous flow
 The discharge is constant throughout the reach of the channel under consideration. This is often the case with a steady flow. This flow is considered continuous and therefore can be described using the continuity equation for continuous steady flow.
 Spatially-varied flow
 The discharge of a steady flow is non-uniform along a channel. This happens when water enters and/or leaves the channel along the course of flow. An example of flow entering a channel would be a road side gutter. An example of flow leaving a channel would be an irrigation channel. This flow can be described using the continuity equation for continuous unsteady flow requires the consideration of the time effect and includes a time element as a variable.

States of flow
The behavior of open-channel flow is governed by the effects of viscosity and gravity relative to the inertial forces of the flow. Surface tension has a minor contribution, but does not play a significant enough role in most circumstances to be a governing factor. Due to the presence of a free surface, gravity is generally the most significant driver of open-channel flow; therefore, the ratio of inertial to gravity forces is the most important dimensionless parameter. Depending on the effect of viscosity relative to inertia, as represented by the Reynolds number, the flow can be either laminar, turbulent, or transitional. However, it is generally acceptable to assume that the Reynolds number is sufficiently large so that viscous forces may be neglected.

Formulation 

It is possible to formulate equations describing three conservation laws for quantities that are useful in open-channel flow: mass, momentum, and energy. The governing equations result from considering the dynamics of the flow velocity vector field  with components . In Cartesian coordinates, these components correspond to the flow velocity in the x, y, and z axes respectively.
 
To simplify the final form of the equations, it is acceptable to make several assumptions:
 
 The flow is incompressible (this is not a good assumption for rapidly-varied flow)
 The Reynolds number is sufficiently large such that viscous diffusion can be neglected
 The flow is one-dimensional across the x-axis

Continuity equation 
Under the assumption of incompressible flow, with a constant control volume , this equation has the simple expression . However, it is possible that the cross-sectional area  can change with both time and space in the channel. If we start from the integral form of the continuity equation:it is possible to decompose the volume integral into a cross-section and length, which leads to the form:Under the assumption of incompressible, 1D flow, this equation becomes:By noting that  and defining the volumetric flow rate , the equation is reduced to:Finally, this leads to the continuity equation for incompressible, 1D open-channel flow:

Momentum equation 
By invoking the high Reynolds number and 1D flow assumptions, we have the equations:The second equation implies a hydrostatic pressure , where the channel depth  is the difference between the free surface elevation  and the channel bottom . Substitution into the first equation gives:where the channel bed slope . Defining the friction slope , a way of quantifying friction losses, leads to the final form of the momentum equation:

Energy equation 
Define  to be the energy density:Noting that  is time-independent, we arrive at the equation:Assuming that the energy density is time-independent and the flow is one-dimensional leads to the simplification:with  being a constant; this is equivalent to Bernoulli's principle. Of particular interest in open-channel flow is the specific energy , which is used to compute the hydraulic head  that is defined as:with  being the specific weight. However, realistic systems require the addition of a head loss term  to account for energy dissipation due to friction and turbulence that was ignored by discounting the external forces term in the momentum equation.

See also

HEC-RAS
Streamflow
Fields of study
Computational fluid dynamics
Fluid dynamics
Hydraulics
Hydrology
Types of fluid flow
Laminar flow
Pipe flow
Transitional flow
Turbulent flow
Fluid properties
Froude number
Reynolds number
Viscosity
Other related articles
Chézy formula
Darcy-Weisbach equation
Hydraulic jump
Manning formula
Saint-Venant equations
Standard step method

References

Further reading 

 Nezu, Iehisa; Nakagawa, Hiroji (1993). Turbulence in Open-Channel Flows. IAHR Monograph. Rotterdam, NL: A.A. Balkema. .
Syzmkiewicz, Romuald (2010). Numerical Modeling in Open Channel Hydraulics. Water Science and Technology Library. New York, NY: Springer. .

External links 

Caltech lecture notes:
Derivation of the Equations of Open Channel Flow
Surface Profiles for Steady Channel Flow
 Open-Channel Flow
Open Channel Flow Concepts
What is a Hydraulic Jump?
Open Channel Flow Example
Simulation of Turbulent Flows (p. 26-38)

Civil engineering
Fluid dynamics
Hydraulics
Hydraulic engineering